This article provides an overview of the transportation infrastructure in the country of Austria.

Railways 
total: 6,123 km (3,523 km electrified)

standard gauge: 5,639 km  gauge (3,429 km electrified).

narrow gauge: 507 km (23 km  gauge, 13 km  gauge, 468 km  gauge - 94 km electrified, and 3 km  gauge).

The national railway system of Austria is the Österreichische Bundesbahnen, or ÖBB.

See also 
 Other railways in Austria

U-Bahn 
Serfaus: see Serfaus U-Bahn, complete ban on cars in the village center
Vienna: see Vienna U-Bahn

S-Bahn 
Graz
Innsbruck
Salzburg
Vienna: see Vienna S-Bahn

Motorways 

total: 200,000 km (100% paved, including 1700 km of expressways)

 A1 (Westautobahn)
 A2 (Südautobahn)
 A3 (Südostautobahn)
 A4 (Ostautobahn)
 A5 (Nordautobahn, planned)
 A6 (Nordostautobahn)
 A7 (Mühlkreisautobahn)
 A8 (Innkreisautobahn)
 A9    (Pyhrnautobahn)
 A10 (Tauernautobahn)
 A11 (Karawankenautobahn)
 A12  (Inntalautobahn)
 A13 (Brennerautobahn)
 A14 (Rheintalautobahn)
 A21 (Wiener Außenringautobahn)
 A22 (Donauuferautobahn)
 A23 (Südosttangente)
 A24 (Verbindungsspange Rothneusiedel, planned)
 A25 (Welser Autobahn)
 A26 (Linzerautobahn, planned)

Waterways 
358 km, mainly along the Danube

Pipelines 
crude oil: 663 km (208)
gas: 2,721 km
refined products: 157 km

Ports and harbours 
All ports access the Danube.
 Enns
 Krems
 Linz
 Vienna

All Austrian ports are via the Rhine-Main-Danube Canal also connected to the port of Rotterdam in the Netherlands.

Merchant marine

Airports 

Austria has 55 airports and two heliport.  Most airports in the country have short, unpaved runways. One airport has paved runways longer than 10,000 feet.

See also
 Plug-in electric vehicles in Austria

References